Watson is a patronymic forename of English and Scottish origin. Meaning "Son of Walter" or "Son of Water", the name originated in Old English because in medieval times the usual pronunciation of Walter was Water. Notable people with the name include:

 Watson Boas (born 1994), Papua New Guinean rugby league footballer
 Watson Cheyne (1852–1932), Scottish surgeon and bacteriologist
 Watson Forbes (1909–1997), Scottish violinist and classical music arranger
 Watson Fothergill (1841–1928), English architect
 Watson Khupe (1962/1963–2022), Zimbabwean politician
 Watson Kirkconnell (1895–1977), Canadian scholar, university administrator and translator
 Watson Nyambek (born 1976), Malaysian sprinter
 Watson Parker (1924–2013), American historian, author and academic
 Watson Reid (1827–1891), Scottish Episcopalian priest
 Watson Spoelstra (1910–1999), American sportswriter
 Watson C. Squire (1838–1926),  American Civil War veteran and politician
 Watson Washburn (1894–1973), American tennis player

See also 
Watson (computer), an IBM supercomputer

References 

Given names originating from a surname
Masculine given names